The German Academy of the Noble Arts of Architecture, Sculpture and Painting, or Teutsche Academie, refers to a comprehensive dictionary of art by Joachim von Sandrart published in the late 17th century. The first version was published in 1675 and it included a compilation of artist biographies  that were later accompanied by illustrations by Richard Collin for a 1683 Latin edition by Christianus Rhodius. The list of portrait illustrations follows and is in page order. Most of the biographies were translated into German from earlier work by Karel van Mander and Cornelis de Bie, but Sandrart had travelled extensively in Europe and added many original biographies of German-born artists to his list. The illustrated portraits of artists born before his time were mostly based on 17th-century engravings by Hieronymus Cock and Jan Meyssens, many of which had also been re-published in De Bie's Het Gulden Cabinet.

Sources
 Teutscher Academie der Edlen Bau, Bild- und Mahlerey-Künste (1675–80)

Art history books
1675 books
Sandrart